On the Ropes is a 1999 American documentary film directed by Nanette Burstein and Brett Morgen. The film follows the career of three young boxers and their coach.

Awards
 Jury Prize, Urbanworld Film Festival, Best Documentary, 1999 
 Special Jury Prize, Sundance Film Festival, Documentary, 1999 
 Silver Spire, San Francisco International Film Festival,  Film & Video - Society and Culture-U.S., 1999
 IDA Award, International Documentary Association,  Feature Documentaries, 1999 
 DGA Award, Directors Guild of America,  Outstanding Directorial Achievement in Documentary, 2000 
 SFFCC Awards, Santa Fe Film Critics Circle Awards, Best Documentary, 2000

References

External links

1999 films
American sports documentary films
1999 documentary films
Films directed by Nanette Burstein
Documentary films about boxing
Films directed by Brett Morgen
Films scored by Theodore Shapiro
1999 directorial debut films
1990s English-language films
1990s American films